Col. George Washington Kavanaugh (May 22, 1862 – September 6, 1951) was an American politician and businessman originally from Waterford, New York.

Early life
Kavanaugh was born on May 22, 1862 in Waterford, New York into a family that was prominent in the knitting industry. He was the son of Mary (née Monaghan) Kavanaugh and Luke Kavanaugh, a pioneer manufacturer of knitting machinery and the inventor of a knitting burr that revolutionized the industry in this country. His younger brother was Frederick W. Kavanaugh, who served in the New York State Senate from 1921 to 1924 and owned significant real estate, including a hotel in Cody, Wyoming (named for his friend, William "Buffalo Bill" Cody); after years of ill-health, Frederick committed suicide in 1940.

Career
After working for his father for several years, Kavanaugh went into business for himself as a Cotton Manufacturer in Cohoes, New York in 1884. In 1896, he was appointed to serve on New York Governor Levi Morton's staff, with the rank of Colonel. In the fall of that year, he was elected to the New York State Assembly from Saratoga County by a plurality of approximately 4,500. His term in office began on January 1, 1897, he was re-elected in 1897 without opposition and served until December 31, 1898.

After his marriage, the Kavanaughs moved into an elegant eight-story Beaux-Arts townhouse at 10 East 62nd Street and soon began to appear in the Society columns. They threw many elaborate parties at their residence, including for Marie's close friend, Elizabeth Hope de la Poer Beresford, Baroness Decies (the former Elizabeth Wharton Drexel). In 1943, as commercial properties began to surround their residence, the Kavanaughs bought the house next door at 8 East 62nd Street to protect their property. The value of the combined properties was $211,000 in 1943.

Personal life
In 1912, while in London, Kavanaugh was married to the Marie Magdalena (née Miller) Haberle (1868–1954). The widow of William Henry Haberle, a brewery heir from Syracuse, New York, she was a daughter of Andrew John Miller (a native of Urspringen in Bavaria) and Caroline (née Gratwohl) Miller (a native of Sigmaringen in Hohenzollern). From her first marriage to Haberle, she had two daughters: Virginia Haberle (who married Burns Lyman Smith) and Leonora Haberle (who married Charles Jolly Werner). In July 1917, Kavanaugh adopted both of Marie's daughters. His wife became known for her extensive and expensive jewelry collection.

Kavanaugh died on September 6, 1951 at their summer home in Spring Lake, New Jersey. After a funeral at Christ Methodist Church at 60th Street and Park Avenue, he was buried at Woodlawn Cemetery in the Bronx. His widow died at their residence in New York City in January 1954.

References

External links

Mrs. George Washington Kavanaugh and her Daughter Leonora Warner, 1943 at the National Gallery of Art
Mrs. George Washington Kavanaugh and Crowd, 1943 at the National Gallery of Art

1862 births
1951 deaths
Republican Party members of the New York State Assembly
People from Waterford, New York
20th-century American politicians
19th-century American politicians